Marc R. Pacheco (born October 29, 1952 in Taunton, Massachusetts) is an American state legislator serving in the Massachusetts Senate. He represents the 1st Plymouth and Bristol district, which includes his hometown of Taunton and nearby towns. He is a Democrat who has served since 1993. From 1989 to 1992 he was a member of the Massachusetts House of Representatives. Prior to serving in the Massachusetts legislature he was a member of the Taunton school committee (1980–89) and the Chief Assistant to the Mayor of Taunton (1982–88).

Pacheco ran in the 9th congressional district special election held in 2001. He finished fourth in the Democratic primary, with 13% of the vote.

Pacheco received an associate degree from the Stockbridge School of Agriculture at the University of Massachusetts Amherst, a bachelor's degree from New Hampshire College (now Southern New Hampshire University), and a master's degree from Suffolk University.

See also
 2019–2020 Massachusetts legislature
 2021–2022 Massachusetts legislature

References

1952 births
21st-century American politicians
Living people
Democratic Party Massachusetts state senators
Democratic Party members of the Massachusetts House of Representatives
Politicians from Taunton, Massachusetts
American people of Portuguese descent
Southern New Hampshire University alumni
Suffolk University alumni
University of Massachusetts Amherst College of Natural Sciences alumni